Intimate Lighting is a Czech drama film directed by Ivan Passer. It was released in 1965.

Plot
A cello player in an orchestra, Peter, returns to his home village to see a childhood friend, Bambas. Bambas is a local music teacher and performs at funerals. Peter and his fiancee stay with Bambas and his family for the day and get involved in some comic exploits, including a possible symphony concert.

Cast
 Zdeněk Bezušek - Petr
 Karel Blažek - Bambas
 Věra Křesadlová - Štěpa, Petr's girlfriend
 Jaroslava Štědrá - Marie, Karel's wife
 Miroslav Cvrk - Kája, Karel's son
 Dagmar Redinová - Marie, Karel's daughter
 Karel Uhlík - Pharmacist
 Vlastimila Vlková - Grandmother
 Jan Vostrčil - Grandfather

Production history 
Ivan Passer had previously made a short film, A Boring Afternoon, which took home a prize at the Lorcano International Film Festival, but he had not directed any features when he was approached by his screenwriting friend Jaroslav Papoušek to direct Intimate Lighting. According to Passer, Papoušek needed money but he could not get paid until he found a director who was willing to attach themselves to his script. Papoušek was rejected by everyone he contacted, forcing him to ask Passer for a favor despite his lack of experience. Passer agreed to help his friend, never expecting the film to be actually made. A few months later, he was surprised when he was told to start work on the project even though the studio had openly expressed their reservations about the script.

Reception 
Dave Kehr of The Chicago Reader called it "one of the finest works of the short-lived Czech New Wave...Passer has forged something funny and rare: a genuine comedy of melancholy — a gray comedy." Jim Hoberman of The Village Voice wrote that it was "a small masterpiece...less interested in narrative than a state of being, the movie is as subtle in its emotional effects as its title would suggest."

References

External links
 

1965 films
1965 comedy-drama films
1960s Czech-language films
Czech black-and-white films
Czech comedy-drama films
Films directed by Ivan Passer
Films with screenplays by Ivan Passer
1960s Czech films